Linnaea spathulata, synonym Abelia spathulata, is a species of Linnaea in the honeysuckle family (Caprifoliaceae).  The plant is endemic to Korea and Japan (the eastern side of Honshu, the west and central Kantō region, and the northwestern part of Kyushu and Shikoku).

References

Caprifoliaceae
Flora of Japan
Flora of Korea